Pike County Hospital, also known as the Smith-Barr Manor, is a historic hospital building located at Louisiana, Pike County, Missouri. It was built in 1927–1928, and is a four-story, rectangular, Classical Revival style red brick and stone building.  It has a flat roof with a two-story square red brick penthouse.  It features a main entrance with decorative stone surround and cartouche, and additional terra cotta and stone ornamentation.  It was converted to a nursing home in 1975.

It was listed on the National Register of Historic Places in 2006.

References

Hospital buildings on the National Register of Historic Places in Missouri
Neoclassical architecture in Missouri
Hospital buildings completed in 1928
Buildings and structures in Pike County, Missouri
National Register of Historic Places in Pike County, Missouri